Richard Henry Recchia (November 20, 1885 - August 17, 1983) was an American sculptor.

Recchia was born in Quincy, Massachusetts, with the given name Ricardo; his father was a marble carver who had worked for Bela Pratt and Daniel Chester French. He studied from 1904-1907 in the School of the Museum of Fine Arts, Boston, and served as assistant to his teacher, Bela Pratt, until 1917. His first major commission was a set of allegorical panels representing architecture for the exterior of the Museum of Fine Arts, Boston. In 1915, he won medals for several works exhibited at San Francisco's Panama-Pacific Exposition. Recchia was a founder of the Boston Society of Sculptors, a charter member of the Guild of Boston Artists, and a member of the National Sculpture Society and Rockport Art Association. He won the Elizabeth N. Watrous Gold Medal for Sculpture in 1944. During the same year, he sculpted the Inspiration and Aspiration medal for the Society of Medalists. He died in Rockport, Massachusetts, where he is buried under his self-sculpted tombstone at the Beech Grove Cemetery.

Selected works 
 Relief of Robert Brown, Brown University
 Curtis Guild bas relief, Curtis Guild Memorial Entrance to the Boston Common
 Baby and Frog, Brookgreen Gardens, South Carolina, 1923
  Mother Goose, Rockport (Massachusetts) Carnegie Library, 1938
 Inspiration - Aspiration, medal, 1944
 Young Pan Playing a Flute, 1956

References 
 National Academy article
 Medallic Art Collector article
 Smithsonian Institution
 CowHampshire blog article

American sculptors
1983 deaths
1885 births